Milica Žabić (born 12 April 1994) is a Serbian judoka. She became European Junior Champion in Judo in 2013 and World Junior Champion in Sambo in 2014.

Achievements

References

External links
 
 
 

1994 births
Living people
Serbian female judoka
European Games competitors for Serbia
Judoka at the 2019 European Games
Mediterranean Games competitors for Serbia
Competitors at the 2022 Mediterranean Games